Datuk Seri Panglima Haji Hajiji bin Noor (born 10 May 1956) is a Malaysian politician who has served as the 16th Chief Minister of Sabah since September 2020 and Member of the Sabah State Legislative Assembly (MLA) for Sulaman since October 1990. He is also the first official chairman of political coalition party in Sabah, the Gabungan Rakyat Sabah Party (GRS Party) and 3rd President of the Parti Gagasan Rakyat Sabah (GAGASAN).

He was appointed Chief Minister in late September 2020 after his coalition, Gabungan Rakyat Sabah (GRS), won 38 out of the 73 seats, in which 37 seats needed for a simple majority in the 2020 state election. His administration was further strengthened after three independent members of state legislative assembly (MLAs) pledged their support for the state government.

Early background 
Hajiji was born in Kampung Serusup, Tuaran as the second of three children of Noor Harun and Teruyah Omar. He firstly attended the Serusup Native Primary School (SK Serusup) for his primary education in 1961 before going for his secondary education in Tuaran District Government Secondary School – now known as Badin Secondary School (SMK Badin) – in 1967. After getting 15 aggregates in Lower Certificate of Education examination, he was transferred to St. John's Secondary School in 1972 and excelled in Malaysian Certificate of Education examination as one of the best students in Tuaran after his high school graduation in 1974.

Career

Public service 
Hajiji started his career as a public servant in 1976. He was tasked to be a radio announcer at Radio Televisyen Malaysia before being appointed as Assistant Development Officer at Tuaran District Office from 1977 to 1982.

Politics 
Hajiji entered politics in 1990 as he contested in the 8th general election as a candidate for Sulaman state constituency representing United Sabah National Organisation (USNO) and subsequently won. He was appointed as Political Secretary to Deputy Prime Minister Ghafar Baba from 1992 to 1993. He was also member of the Bank Rakyat's board of directors from 1991 to 1994.

He joined United Malays National Organisation (UMNO) in 1994 following the dissolution of USNO. He became Tuaran Division Chief a year after until 2018 as well as Treasurer of UMNO Sabah from 2001 to 2018. He remained as an Assembly Member for Sulaman for six terms and is currently serving the seventh term after defeating two other candidates from Sabah Heritage Party (Warisan) and Love Sabah Party (PCS) in the recent state election.

He was appointed as Assistant Minister of State at the Ministry of Youth and Sports (for some times in 1994), Ministry of Industrial Development (1994 to 1996, and then 1999 to 2001), Chief Minister's Department (1996 to 1999) and Ministry of Finance (2001 to 2004). He was promoted as Minister of State for Housing and Local Government from 2004 to 2018 and as Deputy Chief Minister in the Ministry of Infrastructure Development for two days post 14th general election.

Following the fall of BN in Sabah in 2018, he was appointed Sabah UMNO Liaison Chairman. He later joined Malaysian United Indigenous Party (BERSATU) in 2018 and serves as the State chairman for Sabah since 2019. Prime Minister Muhyiddin Yassin nominated Hajiji as Chief Minister if PN win the next state election. Consequently, GRS, in which PN is a member, won the recent state election and moved to Governor Juhar Mahiruddin to name Hajiji as the next Chief Minister, in which the nomination was affirmed by Juhar the day before Hajiji's swearing-in.

in March 2022, Hajiji became the first official chairman of the registered political coalition party in Sabah, named Gabungan Rakyat Sabah Party (GRS Party). The GRS under Hajiji's leadership then formed a unity government with Pakatan Harapan (PH), Barisan Nasional (BN), Gabungan Parti Sarawak (GPS) and other parties in the aftermath of the 15th Malaysian General Election. On 10 December 2022, Hajiji and other BERSATU Sabah leaders leave BERSATU and become direct members of GRS . 

On 07 Jan 2023, a political crisis began when Hajiji Noor lost support from 13 Sabah UMNO member due to the breach of agreement of GRS-PN-BN thus his is no longer the Chief Minister of Sabah with confirmed majority support from the Sabah House of Legislative Assembly and will be continuing to hold this position until the new Chief Minister is elected.

Family 
Hajiji is married to Juliah Salag and has four children namely Mohd. Reza, Khairil Anuar, Nur Diyana and Mohd. Ghazali.

Honours

Honours of Malaysia
 Malaysia:
  Officer of the Order of the Defender of the Realm (KMN) – (1998)
 Sabah:
  Commander of the Order of Kinabalu (PGDK) – Datuk  (1996)
  Grand Commander of the Order of Kinabalu (SPDK) – Datuk Seri Panglima (2013)

Election results

References 

Living people
1956 births
Officers of the Order of the Defender of the Realm
Commanders of the Order of Kinabalu
Grand Commanders of the Order of Kinabalu
People from Sabah
Bajau people
Malaysian Muslims
Malaysian politicians
Former United Malays National Organisation politicians